Sinéad M. Ryan is an Irish theoretical physicist and professor of Theoretical High Energy Physics at Trinity College Dublin. Her research covers "high-energy particle physics, and how particles in atoms such as quarks and gluons stick together".

Education and career 
Ryan started her third-level education at University College Cork, Ireland in 1988 where she earned a first class honours for her B.Sc. After her bachelor's degree, she completed a research M.Sc. in 1993. In 1996, Ryan completed her Ph.D. at The University of Edinburgh.

After the completion of her Ph.D. she became a research associate at Fermi National Accelerator Laboratory (1996–1999). She then held a number of positions at Trinity College Dublin (TCD): Lecturer in High Performance Computing (1999–2000), Tenured Lecturer (2000–2006), Senior Lecturer (2006–2012), Professor (2012–2016), Head of the School of Mathematics (2012–2016), and finally, Chair of Theoretical High Energy Physics (2016–Present).

Since 2000, Ryan has been a journal, grant referee, and institutional reviewer for Physical Review D (PRD), Physical Review Letters (PRL), Physics Letters B (PLB), National Science Foundation (NSF), Natural Sciences and Engineering Research Council of Canada (NSERC), Science and Technology Facilities Council (STFC), and Irish Research Council (IRC).

Ryan has served as a member of Wilson Prize in Lattice QCD Committee as well as on the International Advisory Committee for the Symposium in Lattice Field Theory at CERN from 2013 to the present. She was a founding academic partner of the Trinity Walton Club in 2014.

She has served as chair of the PANDA Theory Advisory Group from 2016 to present as well as the chair of the PRACE Scientific Steering Committee from 2017 to present.

Selected publications 
Ryan's work ranges from quantum chromodynamics, and lattices, to particle collisions and muons.

Supports 
Ryan is a strong supporter of encouraging students, especially female students, in pursuing maths and physics in third level education. In her words, "I think we need to encourage girls to believe they can do maths and physics... it might not always be easy, but it’s worth doing". And she believes it is "important for young students to see that women have done this and it’s not impossible to have a career in maths or physics". She is also a supporter of funding for the Science Foundation Ireland.

References

Alumni of University College Cork
Alumni of the University of Edinburgh
Academics of Trinity College Dublin
Theoretical physicists
Irish women physicists
21st-century Irish scientists
21st-century physicists
21st-century women scientists
Living people
Year of birth missing (living people)